Bishop Ante Ivas (born 26 December 1939) is a Croatian Roman Catholic prelate who served as the Diocesan Bishop of Šibenik since 5 February 1997 until his retirement on 3 June 2016.

Education
Bishop Ivas was born into a Croatian Roman Catholic family of Stjepan and Iva (née Birin) in the present-day Šibenik-Knin County.

After graduation a primary school in his native Vodice and a classical gymnasium in the diocesan seminary in Zadar, he consequently joined the Theological Faculty at the University of Zagreb, where he studied until 1964, and was ordained as priest on July 5, 1964 for the Roman Catholic Diocese of Šibenik, after completed his philosophical and theological studies.

Pastoral work
Fr. Ivas served as the assistant priest in the cathedral parish in Šibenik (1964–1966). From 1988 he served as Vicar General of the Diocese of Šibenik. After the sudden death of the Bishop of Šibenik, Msgr. Srećko Badurina. On September 17, 1996, Ivas was elected a Diocesan Administrator of this diocese.

On February 5, 1997, he was appointed by Pope John Paul II as the Diocesan Bishop of Šibenik. On March 19, 1997, he was consecrated as bishop by Cerdinal Franjo Kuharić and other prelates of the Roman Catholic Church in the St. Jakov Cathedral in Šibenik.

Retired on June 3, 2016, after reached age limit of 75 years old.

References

External links

1939 births
Living people
People from Šibenik-Knin County
University of Zagreb alumni
Bishops of Šibenik
20th-century Roman Catholic bishops in Croatia
21st-century Roman Catholic bishops in Croatia
Bishops appointed by Pope John Paul II